In seven-dimensional geometry, a rectified 7-simplex is a convex uniform 7-polytope, being a rectification of the regular 7-simplex.

There are four unique degrees of rectifications, including the zeroth, the 7-simplex itself. Vertices of the rectified 7-simplex are located at the edge-centers of the 7-simplex. Vertices of the birectified 7-simplex are located in the triangular face centers of the 7-simplex. Vertices of the trirectified 7-simplex are located in the tetrahedral cell centers of the 7-simplex.

Rectified 7-simplex 

The rectified 7-simplex is the edge figure of the 251 honeycomb.

E. L. Elte identified it in 1912 as a semiregular polytope, labeling it as S.

Alternate names
 Rectified octaexon (Acronym: roc) (Jonathan Bowers)

Coordinates 

The vertices of the rectified 7-simplex can be most simply positioned in 8-space as permutations of (0,0,0,0,0,0,1,1). This construction is based on facets of the rectified 8-orthoplex.

Images

Birectified 7-simplex 

Alternate names
 Birectified octaexon (Acronym: broc) (Jonathan Bowers)

Coordinates 

The vertices of the birectified 7-simplex can be most simply positioned in 8-space as permutations of (0,0,0,0,0,1,1,1). This construction is based on facets of the birectified 8-orthoplex.

Images

Trirectified 7-simplex

The trirectified 7-simplex is the intersection of two regular 7-simplexes in dual configuration.

E. L. Elte identified it in 1912 as a semiregular polytope, labeling it as S.

This polytope is the vertex figure of the 133 honeycomb.

Alternate names
 Hexadecaexon (Acronym: he) (Jonathan Bowers)

Coordinates 

The vertices of the trirectified 7-simplex can be most simply positioned in 8-space as permutations of (0,0,0,0,1,1,1,1). This construction is based on facets of the trirectified 8-orthoplex.

The trirectified 7-simplex is the intersection of two regular 7-simplices in dual configuration. This characterization yields simple coordinates for the vertices of a trirectified 7-simplex in 8-space: the 70 distinct permutations of (1,1,1,1,−1,−1,−1,-1).

Images

Related polytopes

Related polytopes 

These polytopes are three of 71 uniform 7-polytopes with A7 symmetry.

See also
List of A7 polytopes

References
 H.S.M. Coxeter: 
 H.S.M. Coxeter, Regular Polytopes, 3rd Edition, Dover New York, 1973 
 Kaleidoscopes: Selected Writings of H.S.M. Coxeter, edited by F. Arthur Sherk, Peter McMullen, Anthony C. Thompson, Asia Ivic Weiss, Wiley-Interscience Publication, 1995,  
 (Paper 22) H.S.M. Coxeter, Regular and Semi Regular Polytopes I, [Math. Zeit. 46 (1940) 380–407, MR 2,10]
 (Paper 23) H.S.M. Coxeter, Regular and Semi-Regular Polytopes II, [Math. Zeit. 188 (1985) 559-591]
 (Paper 24) H.S.M. Coxeter, Regular and Semi-Regular Polytopes III, [Math. Zeit. 200 (1988) 3-45]
 Norman Johnson Uniform Polytopes, Manuscript (1991)
 N.W. Johnson: The Theory of Uniform Polytopes and Honeycombs, Ph.D. 
  o3o3x3o3o3o3o - broc, o3x3o3o3o3o3o - roc, o3o3x3o3o3o3o - he

External links 
 Polytopes of Various Dimensions
 Multi-dimensional Glossary

7-polytopes